882 Swetlana (prov. designation:  or ) is a dark background asteroid from the outer region of the asteroid belt. It was discovered on 15 August 1917, by Russian astronomer Grigory Neujmin at the Simeiz Observatory on the Crimean peninsula. The origin of the asteroid's name remains unknown.

Orbit and classification 

Swetlana is a non-family asteroid of the main belt's background population when applying the hierarchical clustering method to its proper orbital elements. It orbits the Sun in the outer asteroid belt at a distance of 2.3–4.0 AU once every 5 years and 6 months (2,016 days; semi-major axis of 3.12 AU). Its orbit has an eccentricity of 0.27 and an inclination of 6° with respect to the ecliptic. The body's observation arc begins on 18 August 1917, with its independent discovery at Heidelberg Observatory by Max Wolf, just three nights after its official discovery observation by Grigory Neujmin at Simeiz.

Naming 

This minor planet is named after a Feminine Russian first name. Any reference of this name to a person or occurrence is unknown.

Unknown meaning 

Among the many thousands of named minor planets, Swetlana is one of 120 asteroids, for which no official naming citation has been published.

Physical characteristics 

In both the Tholen- and SMASS-like taxonomy of the Small Solar System Objects Spectroscopic Survey (S3OS2), Swetlana is an X-type asteroid.

Rotation period 

In September 2017, a rotational lightcurve of Swetlana was obtained from photometric observations by Thomas A. Polakis at the Command Module Observatory  in Arizona. Lightcurve analysis gave a well-defined rotation period of  hours with a brightness variation of  magnitude. The result supersedes an observations by Italian amateur astronomers Roberto Crippa and Federico Manzini at the Sozzago Astronomical Station  from September 2006, which tentatively determined a period of more than 20 hours and an amplitude of  magnitude.

Diameter and albedo 

The Collaborative Asteroid Lightcurve Link derives an albedo of 0.0491 and a diameter of 43.47 kilometers based on an absolute magnitude of 10.7.

References

External links 
 Lightcurve Database Query (LCDB), at www.minorplanet.info
 Dictionary of Minor Planet Names, Google books
 Asteroids and comets rotation curves, CdR – Geneva Observatory, Raoul Behrend
 Discovery Circumstances: Numbered Minor Planets (1)-(5000) – Minor Planet Center
 
 

000882
Discoveries by Grigory Neujmin
Named minor planets
19170815